The 2000 World Figure Skating Championships had been held at the Palais des Exposition Nice in Nice, France from March 23 to April 3. The event was sanctioned by the International Skating Union. Medals were awarded in men's singles, ladies' singles, pair skating, and ice dancing.

Medal table

Competition notes
Due to a large number of participants, the men's and ladies' qualifying groups were split into groups A and B.

This event had originally been awarded to Brisbane, Australia. However, in late August 1999, the ISU reassigned the event to Nice, allegedly due to the Australian organizers' failure to provide adequate broadcast services.

There were two accidents resulting in withdrawals. Julia Obertas / Dmitri Palamarchuk, who were 10th after the short program, withdrew from the pairs event after a fall during the free skating. Palamarchuk caught an edge (right skate) while executing an overhead lift with Obertas – she was uninjured in the resulting fall but he hit his head on the ice. Palamarchuk lay on the ice for several minutes before getting up and leaving the ice on his own but then lost consciousness and was taken to hospital – no damage was found but he was kept overnight for observation.

In the ice dancing event, Albena Denkova / Maxim Staviski, who were 8th after the original dance also forced to withdraw. She was seriously injured in the practice before the free dance when Peter Tchernyshev's blade slashed her leg above her boot, severing two tendons and a muscle.

Pair skater Stéphane Bernadis said he was attacked on March 28 by an unknown assailant with a razor – resulting in an eight-inch cut down his left forearm – when he opened his hotel room door. Bernadis said he had received a death threat three weeks earlier.

Over 52,000 tickets were sold.

Results

Men

Referee:
 Jan Hoffmann 

Assistant Referee:
 Ronald T. Pfenning 

Judges:
 Jane Garden 
 Christiane Miles 
 Alexander Pentchev 
 Laura McNair 
 Florin Gafencu 
 Elizabeth Ryan 
 Hideo Sugita 
 Zsofia Wagner 
 Philippe Meriguet 

Substitute judge:
 Igor Obraztsov

Ladies

Referee:
 Sally-Anne Stapleford 

Assistant Referee:
 Junko Hiramatsu 

Judges:
 Margo Pauw 
 Vladislav Petukhov 
 Hisashi Yoshikawa 
 Judit Fьrst-Tombor 
 Fabio Bianchetti 
 Nenad Orban 
 Adriana Ordeanu 
 Bjцrg Rosto Jensen 
 Elfriede Beyer 

Substitute judge:
 Hely Abbondati

Pairs

Referee:
 Alexander Lakernik 

Assistant Referee:
 Rita Zonnekeyn 

Judges:
 Marina Sanaya 
 Evgenia Bogdanova 
 Marie Reine Le Gougne 
 Joseph L. Inman 
 Susan Blatz 
 Alexei Shirshov 
 Anna Sierocka 
 Adriana Domanska 
 Jarmila Portova 

Substitute judge:
 Jiasheng Yang

Ice dancing

Referee:
 Courtney Jones 

Assistant Referee:
 Ludmila Mikhailovskaya 

Judges:
 Jean-Bernard Hamel 
 Isabella Micheli 
 Elizabeth Clark 
 Eugenia Gasiorowska 
 Katalin Alpern 
 Akos Pethes 
 Robert J. Horen 
 Halina Gordon-Poltorak 
 Mieko Fujimori 

Substitute judge:
 Yury Kliushnikov

References

World Figure Skating Championships
World Figure Skating Championships
World Figure Skating Championships
International figure skating competitions hosted by France
World Figure Skating Championships, 2000
World Figure Skating Championships
World Figure Skating Championships